This Is My Love is a 1954 American drama film directed by Stuart Heisler, written by Hugh Brooke and Hagar Wilde, and starring Linda Darnell, Rick Jason, Dan Duryea, Faith Domergue, Connie Russell and Hal Baylor. It was released on November 11, 1954, by RKO Pictures.

Plot
Vida Dove lives with younger sister Evelyn and brother-in-law Murray Myer, working in a diner he owns. A former beau of hers, Murray fell in love with her sister, married her, then became paralyzed from a car crash. He now suffers from frequent convulsions and is bitter and cruel to Vida, calling her a spinster and cajoling her to marry and move out.

Vida does have a boyfriend, Eddie Collins, but isn't crazy about him. She forms an instant attraction, however, when Eddie brings his handsome friend Glenn Harris to the diner. Glenn asks her out, but Vida is shocked to discover that Glenn is interested in the married Evelyn as well.

Murray has fits of jealous rage. He makes accusations against his wife when she comes home late. Vida is overjoyed when Glenn asks her on another date, then devastated to learn that Evelyn put him up to it, just to fool her husband. Vida can't believe her sister is going to steal a man she loves for the second time.

At home, Vida takes sleeping pills and neglects Murray, who goes into convulsions. Next morning, she finds him dead. A police investigation, however, shows that Murray received a fatal injection of poison before he died, and Evelyn immediately becomes their prime suspect. Vida refuses to help her sister, and Glenn comes to hate her for it. However, she seems to have a change of heart, and is last seen walking into the police station.

Cast 
Linda Darnell as Vida Dove
Rick Jason as Glenn Harris
Dan Duryea as Murray Myer
Faith Domergue as Evelyn Myer
Hal Baylor as Eddie Collins
Connie Russell as Herself
Jerry Mathers  as David Myer
Susie Mathers as Shirley Myer
Mary Young as Mrs. Timberly
William Hopper as District Attorney
Stuart Randall as Investigator
Kam Tong as Harry
Judd Holdren as Doctor Raines
Carl Switzer as Customer

References

External links 
 

1954 films
1950s English-language films
Films scored by Franz Waxman
Films directed by Stuart Heisler
1954 drama films
American drama films
RKO Pictures films
1950s American films